The 2007 CECAFA U-17 Championship was the first CECAFA U-17 Championship, a football tournament contested by the CAF men's national under-17 teams. All games were played at Bujumbura in Burundi

The final took place on 27 August, between Burundi and Uganda. Burundi won the match 2–0 to claim their first CECAFA U-17 Championship title.

Teams

Group stage

Group A

Group B

Knockout stage

Bracket

Semi-finals

Third place play-off

Final

References
https://www.rsssf.org/tablesc/cecafa-u17-07.html

CECAFA competitions
CEC
CEC
Bujumbura